King-Kok Cheung is an American literary critic specializing in Asian American literature and is a professor in the department of English at UCLA.

Cheung grew up on Hong Kong Island.

Cheung received her Ph.D. in English from the University of California, Berkeley in 1984.

Selected bibliography
Asian American Literature: An Annotated Bibliography, 1988 (with Stan Yogi)
Articulate Silences: Hisaye Yamamoto, Maxine Hong Kingston', Joy Kogawa, 1993
An Interethnic Companion to Asian American Literature, 1996 (editor)
Words Matter: Conversations With Asian American Writers, 2000 (editor)
Seventeen Syllables and Other Stories. Revised and Updated with four new stories, 2001 (introduction)
Heath Anthology of American Literature, Fifth Edition, 2006 (co-editor)
Chinese American Literature Without Borders, 2016 (Author)

Notes

External links
 UCLA website

Living people
American literary critics
University of California, Los Angeles faculty
University of California, Berkeley alumni
Hong Kong academics
Hong Kong emigrants to the United States
Place of birth missing (living people)
Year of birth missing (living people)